Yellow Productions is an independent record label specializing in electronic music. Based in Paris, France, it was founded in 1993 by DJ Yellow and Christophe Le Friant (more famous under Bob Sinclar alias).
The label's roster represents Bob Sinclar & DJ Yellow's tastes in jazz, soul, bossa nova, hip hop and house music. In late 2018, Yellow Productions formed a partnership with Armada Music.

Artists
Christophe Le Friant (under aliases Bob Sinclar, The Mighty Bop and Africanism)
Dimitri from Paris
Kid Loco
Alexander Robotnick
Silent Poets
SomethingAlaMode
Michael Calfan

External links
 Official site
 Yellow Productions on Discogs

French independent record labels
Record labels established in 1993
Electronic music record labels